Dungargarh is one of constituencies of Rajasthan Legislative Assembly in the Bikaner (Lok Sabha constituency).

Dungargarh Constituency covers all voters from Dungargarh tehsil and part of Nokha tehsil, which includes ILRC Kuchor Aathooni.

Members of the Legislative Assembly

References

See also 
 Member of the Legislative Assembly (India)

Bikaner district
Assembly constituencies of Rajasthan